Dangwa Flower Market, also known as the Bulaklakan ng Maynila (Flower Market of Manila), is a fresh flower market in the Sampaloc area of Manila, in the Philippines. The market is composed of several small individually-owned stalls and street vendors selling flowers wholesale and retail 50 to 90 percent cheaper than Metro Manila's flower shops.  In 2004, it was home to 50 flower vendors. Most vendors, but not all, are members of the Dangwa Flower Market Association. The market is centered on Dos Castillas Street at the intersection with Dimasalang Road extending to other streets like Lacson Avenue and Maria Clara Street.

Etymology
The Dangwa Flower Market derived its name from Dangwa Tranco Terminal, the bus station adjacent to the market. Everyday (since the late 1950s), Dangwa Tranco buses, used to transport fresh flowers from the Baguio City and other parts of the Cordilleras to Manila.

History
The flower market was said to have started around 1976, it was then surrounded by middle-class residential area. There used to be a book publishing company called Alip & Sons in the neighborhood. The place grew in popularity as a flower market due to the presence of Dangwa Tranco company with buses coming from Benguet, where most of the cut flowers are produced, delivering fresh blooms and making the nearby area as the first place where the fresh flowers are unloaded.

By the 1980s and the 1990s, the market had surpassed its competitors in Quiapo, Manila and Baclaran in popularity. The market had attributed its growth during the Marcos era to Imelda Marcos, then the First Lady, and her lavish lifestyle. At that time the market provided flowers for big flower shops, which in turn decorated Malacañang Palace.

In 1994, one hardworking business owner started operating for 24 hours due to the growing demand. Soon the rest of the flower vendors decided to operate on a 24-hour basis. The advent of modern technology, specifically short message service (SMS) or "texting", has tremendous impact in the industry providing improved communication with the rural farmers and efficiency in transporting the flowers at a lower cost. SMS have also prevented losses as the flower dealers can easily send feedback to the farmers as to what, and when flowers would be in demand.

The flowers of all varieties, sizes, colors and smells sold in the market has since originate not only from Trinidad Valley in Benguet province but also from various flower farms all over the country like from nearby Tagaytay, Batangas, and Laguna to as far as Davao and Cotabato cities in Mindanao.  The market has also expanded to importing flowers from other countries like Thailand, the Netherlands and Ecuador for other flower varieties. Some of the varieties sold in the market includes mums, roses, orchids, ylang-ylang, gerberas, anthuriums, asters, etc.

Peak season
The flower market's peak seasons are around graduation days, Holy Week, Valentine's Day, All Saints Day and Mother's Day, and December. Sometimes customers flock the market till 11 pm on Valentine's Day.

References

External links

Florists in Dangwa Flower Market, The Philippines

Retail markets in Metro Manila
Buildings and structures in Sampaloc, Manila
Flower markets